Sociedade Esportiva Recreativa Panambi, commonly known as Panambi, is a Brazilian football club based in Panambi, Rio Grande do Sul state.

History
The club was founded on January 1, 2004. The club competed several times in the Campeonato Gaúcho Second Level, and reached the Semifinal Stage of the competition in 2009.

Stadium
Sociedade Esportiva Recreativa Panambi play their home games at Estádio Municipal João Marimon Júnior, commonly known as Complexo Esportivo Piratini. The stadium has a maximum capacity of 3,000 people.

References

Association football clubs established in 2004
Football clubs in Rio Grande do Sul
2004 establishments in Brazil